Robert Saul Benjamin (1909 – October 22, 1979) was a founding partner of the movie-litigation firm Phillips, Nizer, Benjamin, Krim & Ballon, a former co‐chairman of United Artists, and a founding member of Orion Pictures.

Biography
Born to a Jewish family, Benjamin, along with his longtime friend and partner Arthur B. Krim, took over United Artists in 1951. The deal that they struck with then-owners Charlie Chaplin and Mary Pickford was that if the company showed a profit in any one of the first three years of their management, the two would be able to purchase a 50% share of the company for one dollar.

The Krim-Benjamin team quickly showed a profit, and they bought out Chaplin and Pickford to own the company outright in 1955.  In 1957, they took the company public.

In 1979, Robert Benjamin won the Jean Hersholt Humanitarian award posthumously.  His wife Jean accepted the award on his behalf.

References

External links
 

American film studio executives
1909 births
1979 deaths
Orion Pictures Corporation
20th-century American lawyers
Jewish American attorneys
American entertainment lawyers
Businesspeople from Los Angeles
Jean Hersholt Humanitarian Award winners
20th-century American businesspeople
American independent film production company founders
20th-century American Jews